Gudge can refer to:
 Variant spelling of guz, an Asian unit of measure;
 A Cork word for gur cake, also known as chester cake, a pastry confectionary.